Straža pri Dolu is a small settlement in the hills northwest of Frankolovo in the Municipality of Vojnik in eastern Slovenia. The area is part of the traditional region of Styria. It is now included in the Savinja Statistical Region.

References

External links
Straža pri Dolu at Geopedia

Populated places in the Municipality of Vojnik